"Handle on You" is a song co-written and recorded by American country music singer Parker McCollum. It is the lead single to his upcoming fourth studio album Never Enough. McCollum wrote the song with Monty Criswell.

Content
"Handle on You" is about a breakup between the narrator and an unidentified former relationship. McCollum said he wanted to write a song different from his usual songs, and that he chose to focus on the verses after his brother told him that "the best songwriters save their best lines for the verses and not the hooks". Taste of Countrys Billy Dukes called the song a "boozy mid-tempo" and noted the use of steel guitar.

Chart performance

References

2022 singles
2022 songs
Parker McCollum songs
Songs written by Monty Criswell
MCA Nashville Records singles